Loon Lake is an unincorporated community and census-designated place in Stevens County, Washington, United States. The community is served by U.S. Route 395 and Washington State Route 292. Loon Lake has a post office with ZIP code 99148.

References

Unincorporated communities in Stevens County, Washington
Census-designated places in Stevens County, Washington
Unincorporated communities in Washington (state)
Census-designated places in Washington (state)